Peter Szewczyk is an American film and animation director, cinematographer and music video director.

Szewczyk began his film career at George Lucas' Skywalker Ranch and has contributed as an artist on a number of feature films, including the franchises Star Wars, Shrek, Harry Potter, and Avatar.

As a writer and director, Szewczyk partnered with the BBC for the short film "ColourBleed". He then cast Disney alumni Naomi Scott for the award-winning short film "Our Lady of Lourdes". He has also directed music videos for The Maccabees, Naomi Scott, and Skunk Anansie.

He is represented in the UK, USA, Europe and South Africa by NERD Productions.

Awards
 2015  "Freederm Goose, Part 2" commercial wins Bronze for Best Animation at Kinsale Shark Awards 2015 in Ireland.
 2014  "Freederm Goose" commercial wins Bronze for Best Animation at Epica Awards 2014.
 2013  "Our Lady Of Lourdes", HollyShorts Film Festival, Best VFX.
 2013  "Our Lady Of Lourdes", Chicago Horror Film Festival, Best Special FX 
 2012  "ColourBleed", Fantasporto, Best Short Film.
 2011  "ColourBleed", HollyShorts Film Festival, Best International Short.
 2011  "ColourBleed", Sitges Film Festival, Special Jury Prize.

Filmography

Music videos

Short films

Other filmography

References

External links

Peter Szewczyk on IMVDb

Living people
American film directors
Year of birth missing (living people)